The following lists events that happened during 1960 in South Africa.

Incumbents
 Monarch: Queen Elizabeth II
 Governor-General: Charles Robberts Swart (from 12 January).
 Prime Minister: Hendrik Verwoerd.
 Chief Justice: Lucas Cornelius Steyn.

Events
January
 21 – 435 miners die in the Coalbrook mining disaster, the worst mine disaster in South Africa.

February
 3 – Harold Macmillan delivers his Wind of Change speech to the Parliament of South Africa in Cape Town.

March
 21 – Police kill an estimated 69 people during the Sharpeville massacre.
 22 – Hendrik Verwoerd tells Parliament that the Anti-Pass Resistance in Sharpeville, Gauteng was not targeted against the government.
 23 – Robert Sobukwe, leader of the Pan Africanist Congress, Albert Lutuli and 11 others are arrested for incitement of riots.
 24 – All public meetings of more than 12 people are banned.
 30 – The government declares a State of Emergency.

April
 8 – The government bans the African National Congress and the Pan Africanist Congress with the coming into effect of the Unlawful Organisations Act.
 9 – David Pratt shoots and wounds Hendrik Verwoerd, the Prime Minister of South Africa, while he opens the Rand Easter Show at Milner Park, Johannesburg.
 19 – The South West Africa People's Organisation (SWAPO) is founded in Windhoek, South West Africa.

May
 4 – Robert Sobukwe, President of the Pan Africanist Congress, is sentenced to 3 years imprisonment for incitement of black Africans to urge the repeal of pass laws.
 6 – Umhlobo Wenene FM is founded.

July
 15 – The first Boeing 707 arrives in South Africa.

October
 5 – The white population votes in a referendum to sever South Africa's last links with the British monarchy and become a republic.

November 
 14 – Serial Killer "Pangaman" Elias Xitavhudzi is hanged for the murders of 16 white men and women in Atteridgeville in the 1950s.

Births
 12 March – Sello Maake Ka-Ncube, actor.
 14 April – Pat Symcox, cricketer
 8 June – Frank Opperman, actor
 24 June – Carel du Plessis, rugby player
 16 July – PJ Powers aka Thandeka, musician.
 24 August – Geraldine Fraser-Moleketi, politician.
 25 August – David Mabuza, Deputy President of South Africa
 13 September – Kevin Carter, photojournalist. (d. 1994)
 18 October – Mark Mathabane, author, lecturer and college professor.

Deaths
 13 June – Ken McArthur, athlete. (b. 1881)

Railways

Sports

References

South Africa
Years in South Africa
History of South Africa